Arne Lindtner Næss (born 19 December 1944) is a Norwegian actor, director, television producer, and writer. He has had many film and television roles. The best known may be Frode Birkeland in the television series Familiesagaen De syv søstre on TV2. His father was film director, producer, and screenwriter Peder Hamdahl Næss.

Filmography (film and TV)

External links 

1944 births
Living people
Norwegian male film actors
Norwegian film directors
Norwegian writers
Norwegian television producers
Norwegian male television actors